Clifton Junction is an unincorporated community located in Wayne County, Tennessee, United States.  The community is located at the junction of U.S. Route 641 and U.S. Route 64.  The music video for  Mark Collie's song Hardin County Line was filmed in this area.  Clifton Junction is located a few miles south of the city of Clifton.

Nearby Cities and Communities
Clifton
Olive Hill
Waynesboro
Houston

References

Unincorporated communities in Wayne County, Tennessee
Unincorporated communities in Tennessee